Robert Dale Henderson (March 14, 1945 – April 21, 1993) was an American spree killer. He murdered at least twelve victims.

Early life 
Henderson was born in Missouri, the son of Mary and Robert Henderson. At the age of fifteen, he lived in Park Hills, Missouri. The Henderson family then moved to Poplar Bluff, Missouri, after which his parents soon divorced. He attended high school somewhere in Missouri, dropping out in 1962. After dropping out, Henderson served in the United States Army. He had duties in Fort Polk South, Louisiana, followed by a stint in Korea.

Henderson was discharged on May 14, 1964, for attacking an officer. After being discharged, he worked numerous jobs. In the 1970s, Henderson's residence was raided as part of an investigation into a suspected marijuana ring. He also had stolen a driver's license in Brevard County, Florida. In 1977, Henderson committed a robbery in Laramie, Wyoming, for which he was sent to the Wyoming State Penitentiary in October 1978. He was later incarcerated in Robertson, Wyoming.

Henderson was released in July 1981, moving into the home of tobacco farmer Ivan Barnett, his new wife's father.

Murders 
On January 14, 1982, he kidnapped, sexually assaulted, and murdered beautician Jerilyn Stanfield in Cincinnati, Ohio. 

Henderson then murdered his in-laws, Barnett, his wife Marie, and their eleven-year-old son Clifford in Cherry Fork, Ohio on January 21, 1982. Three days later, he murdered receptionist Lucinda Lee Russell in Charleston, South Carolina. On January 25, 1982, he murdered physician Murray Ferderber and retail clerk Dorothy Wilkinson in Palatka, Florida. On the same date, Henderson sexually assaulted a mother and a daughter in Valdosta, Georgia. Henderson then murdered Cheryl McDonald in Pascagoula, Mississippi on January 27, 1982.

Henderson murdered nightclub owner Sam Corrent in Port Allen, Louisiana on January 29, 1982. He then murdered hitchhikers Robert Dawson, Frances Bell Dickey, and Vernon D. Odom in Hernando County, Florida on February 4, 1982. After killing the twelve victims, Henderson turned himself in at a jail in Punta Gorda, Florida on February 6, 1982.

Trial and execution 
Despite his lawyers attempts to keep Henderson out of the electric chair, he was given three death sentences. Henderson's lawyers appealed once to the Supreme Court of the United States for a new trial, but the request was denied.

Henderson was executed by electric chair on April 21, 1993, at the Florida State Prison. He was pronounced dead at 7:10 a.m.

See also 
 Capital punishment in Florida
 Capital punishment in the United States
 List of people executed in Florida

References 

1945 births
1993 deaths
20th-century American criminals
20th-century executions by Florida
American people convicted of murder
American spree killers
Executed spree killers
Family murders
People convicted of murder by Florida
People executed for murder
People executed by Florida by electric chair
People from Missouri